Creation Adventures Museum is a creationist museum, located in Arcadia, Florida, in the United States. The museum was established by Gary Parker in 2000.

References

External links

 
  by Gary Parker

2000 establishments in Florida
Creationist museums in the United States
Museums established in 2000
Religious museums in Florida